The 1989 Mr. Olympia contest was an IFBB professional bodybuilding competition held on September 9, 1989, at Sala Dei Congressi in Rimini, Italy.

Results

The total prize money awarded was $170,000.

Notable events

Lee Haney won his sixth consecutive Mr. Olympia title

References

External links 
 Mr. Olympia

 1989
1989 in Italian sport
1989 in bodybuilding
Bodybuilding competitions in Italy